William Gerald Standridge (November 27, 1953 – April 12, 2014) was an American stock car racing driver. He was a competitor in the NASCAR Winston Cup Series and Busch Series.

Career
Born November 27, 1953, Standridge started his racing career in the Goody's Dash Series. Standridge began running the NASCAR Busch Series in 1986, when he finished 14th at the All Pro 300 at Charlotte Motor Speedway in his own Pontiac. After that, he began running a limited schedule in the Busch Series, posting five top-ten finishes in 84 starts, the last of which came in 1993. In 1994, he began running a limited schedule in Winston Cup, making his debut at North Carolina Speedway but finishing 42nd after a crash. He ran seven more races that year, his best finish being a 24th at the Southern 500 as well as picking up sponsorship from the WCW and Dura Lube. He followed that up with a 14th-place finish at Darlington the following year.

After an unsuccessful stint with Triad Motorsports in 1996 and 1997 (he was released after New Hampshire's summer race in 1997), Standridge began running his own team, the #47 Ford Thunderbird, picking up sponsorship from Jayski and also from fan-sponsored donations. He even picked up sponsorship from Phillips after Geoffrey Bodine failed to qualify for a 1998 Talladega race. Standridge was one of the last drivers to run in NASCAR using a Thunderbird after other teams switched to the redesigned Taurus for the 1998 season.

His last career start was that the Pepsi 400 in 1998, where his engine expired 19 laps into the race. His last attempt ever came in 1999, when he filled in for Dan Pardus in the Midwest Transit Racing Chevy at Rockingham Speedway in 2nd-round-qualifying, but his time was not fast enough to make the race. Outside of NASCAR, Standridge ran an auto-parts store in Shelby, North Carolina.

In March 2014, Standridge was diagnosed with cancer. He died on April 12, 2014 at his home in Lake Wylie, South Carolina. Standridge was survived by his wife, five children, and seven grandchildren.

Motorsports career results

NASCAR
(key) (Bold – Pole position awarded by qualifying time. Italics – Pole position earned by points standings or practice time. * – Most laps led.)

Winston Cup Series

Daytona 500 results

Busch Series

ARCA Bondo/Mar-Hyde Series
(key) (Bold – Pole position awarded by qualifying time. Italics – Pole position earned by points standings or practice time. * – Most laps led.)

References

External links
 
 
 Standridge Auto

1953 births
2014 deaths
People from Shelby, North Carolina
Racing drivers from North Carolina
NASCAR drivers
ISCARS Dash Touring Series drivers
Deaths from cancer in South Carolina
ARCA Menards Series drivers